Mortlock Islands can refer to:
Nomoi Islands, a group of three large atolls in the state of Chuuk, Federated States of Micronesia
Takuu Atoll, a Melanesian outlier atoll northeast of Bougainville, Papua New Guinea